Mitesh Kishorbhai Patel (born 9 May 1976 in Gujarat, India) is an Indian-born ,New Zealand field hockey player, who earned his first cap for the national team, nicknamed The Black Sticks, in 1998. He is nicknamed "Meat Dish" or "Petal". Patel earned a total number of 135 caps during his career.

International Senior tournaments
 1998 – Commonwealth Games
 2000 – Sultan Azlan Shah Cup
 2000 – Olympic Qualifying Tournament
 2001 – World Cup Qualifying Tournament
 2002 – World Cup
 2002 – Commonwealth Games
 2003 – Sultan Azlan Shah Cup
 2003 – Champions Challenge
 2004 – Olympic Qualifying Tournament
 2004 – Summer Olympics
 2004 – Champions Trophy
 2006 – World Cup

References

External links
 
 

New Zealand male field hockey players
Olympic field hockey players of New Zealand
Field hockey players at the 1998 Commonwealth Games
Field hockey players at the 2002 Commonwealth Games
2002 Men's Hockey World Cup players
Field hockey players at the 2004 Summer Olympics
2006 Men's Hockey World Cup players
Commonwealth Games silver medallists for New Zealand
1976 births
Living people
New Zealand sportspeople of Indian descent
Commonwealth Games medallists in field hockey
Hampstead & Westminster Hockey Club players
Medallists at the 2002 Commonwealth Games